Hills Hornets is a NBL1 East club based in Sydney, New South Wales. The club fields a team in both the Men's and Women's NBL1 East. The club is a division of Hills Basketball Association (HBA), the major administrative basketball organisation in the Hills District of Sydney. The Hornets play their home games at Hills Basketball Stadium.

Club history

Background 
The Hills Basketball Association was established in 1984 and became incorporated in 1989. In 1995, the association built the Hills Basketball Stadium where the association operates from and acts as the home venue for Hornets games.

Representative Competitions 
The Hills Hornets compete in the various men's and women's competitions operated by Basketball New South Wales including the top-tier NBL1 East, formerly known as the Waratah League. The Hornets were runners-up in 2003's Waratah League Men's tournament as well as runners-up in the 1997 & 1998 Premier Division women's tournaments.

The Hornets were also repeat champions of the Women's National Wheelchair Basketball League from 2003 to 2009.

Venue 
The Hornets and most recreational competitions operated by the association, play games at the Hills Basketball Stadium. The stadium is located in the Fred Caterson Reserve in Castle Hill, New South Wales. The stadium was built in 1995 by the association and featured 4 full sized indoor courts, cafe, player/official facilities and the offices of the association. In 2018, the stadium expanded to add new facilities and an additional two courts.

Notable players 
A number of former Hornets representative players have gone on to play professionally in Australia and overseas:

 AJ Ogilvy, a former Hornet who currently plays with the Illawarra Hawks of the National Basketball League (NBL), the full professional men's league in Australia.
 Julian Kazzouh, a Hornets junior product who played professionally, last with the Sydney Kings of the NBL. An injury ended his last active season prematurely.
 Josh Green, an NBA prospect playing college basketball for Arizona.

References

External links 
 HBA's official website

Waratah League teams
Defunct National Basketball League (Australia) teams
Basketball teams established in 1984
1984 establishments in Australia
Sports teams in Sydney
Basketball teams in New South Wales
The Hills Shire